Boru may refer to:

Places 
 Börü, Azerbaijan (Erməni Borisi), a village in Goranboy District
 Börü, Kyrgyzstan, a village in Osh Region

People 
 Boru Chandidas (born 1408), medieval Bengali poet
 Brian Boru (941–1014), King of Ireland
 Sean Boru (born 1953), Irish actor and author
 Sorcha Boru (1900–2006), potter and sculptor

Other
Boru, a military trumpet in Turkey